Camembe Airport  is a public use airport serving Camembe, Bengo Province, Angola.

See also

 List of airports in Angola
 Transport in Angola

References

External links 
OpenStreetMap - Camembe
OurAirports - Camembe

Airports in Angola